The 2009 Meath Intermediate Football Championship is the 83rd edition of the Meath GAA's premier club Gaelic football tournament for intermediate graded teams in County Meath, Ireland. The tournament consists of 15 teams, with the winner going on to represent Meath in the Leinster Intermediate Club Football Championship. The championship starts with a group stage and then progresses to a knock out stage.

This was Kilmainhamwood's first year in this grade since 1994, after 14 years in the Senior grade since being relegated in 2008.

On 26 October 2009, Oldcastle claimed their 2nd Intermediate championship title when they defeated Kilmainhamwood 2-11 to 0-6, succeeding St. Ultan's as Intermediate champions.

Drumconrath were relegated from this grade, after 13 years as an Intermediate club.

Team changes
The following teams have changed division since the 2008 championship season.

From I.F.C.
Promoted to S.F.C.
 St. Ultan's  -  (Intermediate Champions)

Relegated to J.A.F.C.
 Ballivor

To I.F.C.
Relegted from S.F.C.
 Kilmainhamwood

Promoted from J.A.F.C.
 Moynalvey - (Junior 'A' Champions)

Group stage
In the group stage, there are three groups called Group A, B and C. Two teams from each group go through to finals of the tournament. The three teams that finish last in each group go to the relegation play off.

Group A

Round 1:
 St. Michael's 2-9, 0-6 Carnaross, Moynalty, 16/4/2009,
 Dunderry 1-18, 3-3 Drumconrath, Donore, 19/4/2009,
 Gaeil Colmcille 3-9, 2-11 Na Fianna, Boardsmill, 19/4/2009,

Round 2:
 Carnaross 1-13, 1-10 Drumconrath, Moynalty, 1/5/2009,
 Na Fianna 1-7, 0-8 Dunderry, Dunshaughlin, 3/5/2009 
 Gaeil Colmcille 1-11, 0-11 St. Michael's, 3/5/2009,

Round 3:
 Na Fianna 2-12, 0-5 Drumconrath, Dunderry, 12/6/2009,
 Dunderry 0-16, 2-9 St. Michael's, Bohermeen, 13/6/2009,
 Gaeil Colmcille 1-14, 2-7 Carnaross, Ballinlough, 13/6/2009,

Round 4:
 St. Michael's 1-12, 1-10 Drumconrath, Meath Hill, 6/9/2009,
 Na Fianna 1-9, 0-10 Carnaross, Simonstown, 12/9/2009, 
 Dunderry 0-13, 1-5 Gaeil Colmcille, Bohermeen, 13/9/2009,

Round 5:
 Gaeil Colmcille 3-11, 0-7 Drumconrath, Syddan, 19/9/2009,
 Dunderry 1-15, 0-8 Carnaross, Martry, 20/9/2009,
 St. Michael's 2-13, 2-9 Na Fianna, Athboy, 20/9/2009.

Group B

 
Round 1:
 Kilmainhamwood 1-9, 1-9 Ballinlough, Carnaross, 19/4/2009,
 Cortown 1-11, 1-11 Castletown, Carlanstown, 19/4/2009,
 Moynalvey - Bye

Round 2:
 Kilmainhamwood 0-11, 0-6 Cortown, Castletown, 4/5/2009,
 Ballinlough 2-7, 1-7 Moynalvey, Athboy, 4/5/2009,
 Castletown - Bye

Round 3:                
 Cortown 0-11, 0-10 Ballinlough, Kells, 13/6/2009,
 Moynalvey 1-8, 0-10 Castletown, Bective, 21/6/2009,
 Kilmainhamwood - Bye

Round 4:
 Ballinlough 2-8, 0-13 Castletown, Moynalty, 6/9/2009,
 Kilmainhamwood 2-5, 0-11 Moynalvey, Pairc Tailteann, 15/9/2009,
 Cortown - Bye

Round 5:
 Kilmainhamwood 1-9, 1-9 Castletown, Drumconrath, 19/9/2009,
 Cortown 2-13, 1-10 Moynalvey, Bective, 19/9/2009,
 Ballinlough - Bye

Group C

Round 1:
 Nobber 1-10, 1-9 St. Colmcille's, Slane, 19/4/2009,
 Oldcastle 1-14, 1-8 Syddan, Athboy, 19/4/2013 
 Clann na nGael - Bye,

Round 2:
 Nobber 1-8, 1-5 Syddan, Meath Hill, 1/5/2009,
 St. Colmcille's 1-10, 1-8 Clann na nGael, Dunsany, 2/5/2009,
 Oldcastle - Bye

Round 3:

 St. Colmcille's 1-16, 0-12 Syddan, Slane, 13/6/2009,
 Clann na nGael 2-8, 0-9 Oldcastle, Moynalty, 13/6/2009 
 Nobber - Bye

Round 4:
 Oldcastle 2-10, 0-8 St. Colmcille's, Rathkenny, 12/9/2009,
 Nobber 2-11, 1-9 Clann na nGael, Carnaross, 17/9/2009,
 Syddan - Bye

Round 5:
 Oldcastle 0-13, 1-8 Nobber, Ballinlough, 24/9/2009,
 Syddan 2-9, 0-11 Clann na nGael, Moynalty,
 St. Colmcille's - Bye

Knock Out Stage

Relegation Play Off
The teams that finished bottom of each group play in the relegation play off.

Game 1: Clann na nGael 1-10 , 0-8 Castletown, Kilberry, 17/10/2009,

Relegation Final: Castletown 0-12, 2-3 Drumconrath, Pairc Tailteann, 24/10/2009,

Finals

The teams in the quarter-finals are the second placed teams from each group and one group winner. The teams in the semi finals are two group winners and the quarter final winners.

Preliminary Quarter-final
 St. Colmcille's 1-10, 0-10 Cortown, Simonstown, 29/9/2009,

Quarter-final 
 Kilmainhamwood 1-10, 0-8 St. Michael's, Carnaross, 3/10/2009,
 Nobber 1-11, 2-7 Gaeil Colmcille, Moynalty, 4/10/2009,
 Oldcastle 1-16, 2-8 Ballinlough, Pairc Tailteann, 4/10/2009, AET 
 Dunderry 2-15, 1-6 St. Colmcille's, Seneschalstown, 4/10/2009,

Semi-final
 Kilmainhamwood 1-12 , 0-15 Nobber, Pairc Tailteann, 10/10/2009, AET 
 Oldcastle 0-14, 0-11  Dunderry, Pairc Tailteann, 10/10/2009,
 Kilmainhamwood 1-15, 0-15 Nobber, Pairc Tailteann, 18/10/2009,

Final

 Oldcastle 2-11, 0-6 Kilmainhamwood, Pairc Tailteann, 26/10/2009.

Leinster Intermediate Club Football Championship

Quarter-final:
 Maynooth 1-7, 0-6 Oldcastle, Maynooth, 17/11/2016,

References

External links

Meath Intermediate Football Championship
Meath Intermediate Football Championship